Jaap Reesink (born 22 August 1946) is a retired Dutch rower. He competed at the 1968 Summer Olympics in the eight event and finished in eighth place.

References

1946 births
Living people
Dutch male rowers
Olympic rowers of the Netherlands
Rowers at the 1968 Summer Olympics
Rowers from Amsterdam